Tākitimu was a waka (canoe) with whakapapa throughout the Pacific particularly with Samoa, the Cook Islands, and New Zealand in ancient times. In several Māori traditions, the Tākitimu was one of the great Māori migration ships that brought Polynesian migrants to New Zealand from Hawaiki. The canoe was said to be captained by Tamatea.

Cook Islands Māori traditions 
The Tākitumu (sic) was an important waka in the Cook Islands with one of the districts on the main island of Rarotonga consequently named after it. Sir Tom Davis, Pa Tuterangi Ariki, KFE, wrote in the form of a novel, an account of 300 years of voyaging of the Tākitumu (sic) by his own forebears as told in their traditions.

New Zealand Māori traditions
The Tākitimu appears in many traditions around New Zealand. Most accounts agree that the Tākitimu was a sacred canoe. Many also give the name of the captain as "Tamatea", although in different forms. (He is not to be confused with Tama-te-kapua, who sailed the Arawa to New Zealand.)

Traditions of the East Coast

East Cape
The Takitimu waka landed at Whangaōkena (East Cape), Ūawa (Tolaga Bay), Tūranganui (Gisborne), Nukutaurua (on Māhia Peninsula) and other points further south along the East Coast.

Te Māhia accounts
Accounts from the northern East Coast indicate that the Tākitimu left Hawaiki after two brothers, Ruawharo and Tūpai, took the canoe from their enemies and escaped to New Zealand. The vessel landed on the Māhia Peninsula (Te Māhia) and the crew dispersed: Ruawharo stayed at Te Māhia, a man named Puhiariki went to Muriwhenua in present-day Northland, while others moved to Tauranga.

Ngāti Kahungunu accounts
According to Ngāti Kahungunu, the Tākitimu was captained by Tamatea Arikinui, who landed and settled in the Tauranga area. Some of his descendants gave rise to Ngāti Kahungunu. Others journeyed along the east coast, including two tohunga (priests): Ruawharo, who settled at Te Māhia; and Tūpai, who settled in the Wairarapa. Command of the vessel was given to Tahu Pōtiki, who travelled up the Wairoa River, and later to the South Island, where he became the founding ancestor of Ngāi Tahu.

Traditions of the Bay of Plenty
The tribes of the Tauranga region refer to the canoe as Takitimu. Some traditions say that the Takitimu was captained by Tamatea, father of Ranginui, and Kahungunu the founding ancestor of Ngāti Ranginui. Ngāti Kahungunu recognise this "Tamatea" as the grandson of Tamatea Arikinui, and refer to him as "Tamatea-pokaiwhenua-pokaimoana". However, accounts in Northland and Tauranga do not indicate the existence of more than one "Tamatea" from the Takitimu.

Traditions of the South Island
South Island traditions indicate that Tamatea explored the western and southern coastlines of the South Island. The Tākitimu is said to have been turned to stone at Murihiku. From there, Tamatea is said to have built another canoe, the Kāraerae, to return to the North Island.

See also
List of Māori waka

References

 
Māori waka
Māori mythology